This article represents the structure of the Austrian Armed Forces since April 2019:

Unit designations 
The Austrian Army uses Jäger to denote its infantry formations. Armoured units equipped with main battle tanks are designated as Panzer formations, while mechanized infantry units equipped with tracked infantry fighting vehicles are designated as Panzergrenadier formations.

Ministry of Defence and Sports 
The Austrian Armed Forces are administered by the Ministry of Defence and Sports located in Vienna. The Ministry controls the following entities:

 Ministry of National Defence and Sport, in Vienna
 General Staff, in Vienna
 Section I: Personnel and legal office
 National Defense Academy (Landesverteidigungsakademie), in Vienna
 Theresian Military Academy (Theresianische Militärakademie), in Wiener Neustadt
 Army Non-Commissioned Officers Academy (Heeresunteroffiziersakademie), in Enns
 Museum of Military History, in Vienna
 Section II: Sport
 Army Intelligence Office (Heeresnachrichtenamt), in Vienna
 Intelligence Defence Office, in Vienna
 Geographic and Topographic Military Institute (Institut für Militärisches Geowesen), in Vienna
 Military Real Estate Management Center (Militärisches Immobilienmanagementzentrum), in Vienna
 Procurement and Defense Technology Office (Amt für Rüstung und Wehrtechnik), in Vienna
 Austrian Military Library (Österreichische Militärbibliothek), in Vienna

Chief of the General Staff 
The office of the Chief of the General Staff commands the two operational commands of the Austrian Armed Forces and the Austrian Special Forces:

 Chief of the General Staff  in Vienna
 General Staff in Vienna
 Section III: Preparedness - directs the Armed Forces Basis Command
 Section IV: Operations - directs the Armed Forces Command
 Jagdkommando (Special Forces), in Wiener Neustadt

Armed Forces Command 
 Armed Forces Command (Kommando Streitkräfte), in Graz and Salzburg
 Armed Forces Troops School (Heerestruppenschule), in Eisenstadt
 Pilot and Air-defense Troops School (Flieger- und Fliegerabwehrtruppenschule), at Langenlebarn Air Base
 Airplane Instruction Squadron (Lehrabteilung Flugzeuge), at Zeltweg Air Base, with PC-7 Turbo-Trainer trainers
 Helicopter Instruction Squadron (Lehrabteilung Hubschrauber), at Langenlebarn Air Base, with Alouette III helicopters
 Air Materiel Staff (Materialstab Luft), in Vienna
 NBC-defense Center (ABC-Abwehrzentrum), in Korneuburg
 NBC-defense Company (ABC-Abwehrkompanie)
 International Missions Base (Auslandseinsatzbasis), in Götzendorf an der Leitha
 Command Support Battalion 1 (Führungsunterstützungsbataillon 1), in Villach (Note: a signal unit)
 Staff Company (Stabskompanie)
 1st Command Support Company (1. Führungsunterstützungskompanie)
 2nd Command Support Company (2. Führungsunterstützungskompanie)
 3rd Command Support Company (3. Führungsunterstützungskompanie), (Note: doubles as Cadre-Presence Unit)
 Electronic Warfare Company (Elektronische Kampfführungskompanie)
 Command Support Battalion 2 (Führungsunterstützungsbataillon 2), in St Johann im Pongau (Note: a signal unit)
 Staff Company (Stabskompanie)
 1st Command Support Company (1. Führungsunterstützungskompanie)
 2nd Command Support Company (2. Führungsunterstützungskompanie)
 3rd Command Support Company (3. Führungsunterstützungskompanie), (Note: doubles as Cadre-Presence Unit)
 Electronic Warfare Company (Elektronische Kampfführungskompanie)
 Jäger Battalion 8 (Jägerbataillon 8), in Wals-Siezenheim
 1st Jäger Company (1. Jägerkompanie)
 2nd Jäger Company (2. Jägerkompanie)
 Jäger Company Pongau (Militia) (Jägerkompanie Pongau), in St Johann im Pongau
 Combat Support Company (Kampfunterstützungskompanie), with sGrW 86 120mm mortars and RBS 56 BILL anti-tank missiles
 Military Police (Militärpolizei), in Vienna
 1st Military Police Company (1. Kompanie/Militärpolizei), in Vienna an
 Field Office (Außenstelle), in Eisenstadt
 2nd Military Police Company (2. Kompanie/Militärpolizei), in Graz
 3rd Military Police Company (3. Kompanie/Militärpolizei), in Salzburg
 Field Office (Außenstelle), in Hörsching
 Field Office (Außenstelle), in Innsbruck
 4th Military Police Company (4. Kompanie/Militärpolizei), in Sankt Pölten
 5th Military Police Company (5. Kompanie/Militärpolizei), in Klagenfurt
 Instruction and Formation Department (Abteilung für Lehre und Grundlagenarbeit), in Vienna

3rd Jäger Brigade 
  3rd Jäger Brigade (Rapid Forces Brigade) (3. Jägerbrigade (Brigade Schnelle Kräfte)), in Mautern an der Donau
 Staff Battalion 3 (Stabsbataillon 3), in Mautern an der Donau
 Staff Company (Stabskompanie)
 Command Support Company (Führungsunterstützungskompanie), (Note: the brigade's signal company)
 Supply and Transport Company (Nachschub- und Transportkompanie)
 Maintenance Company (Werkstattkompanie)
 NBC-defense Company (ABC-Abwehrkompanie)
 Instruction Company (Lehrkompanie), in Weitra
Jäger Company Tulln (Militia) (Jägerkompanie Tulln), in Mautern an der Donau
 Jäger Battalion 17 (Jägerbataillon 17), in Straß
 Staff Company (Stabskompanie)
 1st Jäger Company (1. Jägerkompanie), with Pandur EVO armoured personnel carriers
 2nd Jäger Company (2. Jägerkompanie), with Pandur EVO armoured personnel carriers, (Note: doubles as Cadre-Presence Unit)
 Jäger Company Deutschlandsberg (Militia) (Jägerkompanie Deutschlandsberg), in Straß
 Combat Support Company (Kampfunterstützungskompanie), with sGrW 86 120mm mortars and RBS 56 BILL anti-tank missiles
 Jäger Battalion 19 (Jägerbataillon 19), in Güssing
 Staff Company (Stabskompanie)
 1st Jäger Company (1. Jägerkompanie), with Pandur I armoured personnel carriers
 2nd Jäger Company (2. Jägerkompanie), with Pandur I armoured personnel carriers, (Note: doubles as Cadre-Presence Unit)
 Combat Support Company (Kampfunterstützungskompanie), with sGrW 86 120mm mortars and RBS 56 BILL anti-tank missiles
 Jäger Battalion 33 (Jägerbataillon 33), in Zwölfaxing
 Staff Company (Stabskompanie)
 1st Jäger Company (1. Jägerkompanie), with Dingo 2 armoured vehicles
 2nd Jäger Company (2. Jägerkompanie), with Dingo 2 armoured vehicles, (Note: doubles as Cadre-Presence Unit)
 Jäger Company Wien 10/Favoriten (Militia) (Jägerkompanie Wien 10/Favoriten (Miliz)), in Vienna
 Combat Support Company (Kampfunterstützungskompanie), with sGrW 86 120mm mortars and RBS 56 BILL anti-tank missiles
 Reconnaissance and Artillery Battalion 3 (Aufklärungs- und Artilleriebataillon 3), in Mistelbach
 Staff Company (Stabskompanie)
 1st Reconnaissance Company (1. Aufklärungskompanie), with Husar reconnaissance vehicles
 2nd Reconnaissance Company (2. Aufklärungskompanie), with Husar reconnaissance vehicles
 1st Armoured Howitzer Battery (1. Panzerhaubitzbatterie), with M109 A5Ö 155mm self-propelled howitzers
 2nd Armoured Howitzer Battery (2. Panzerhaubitzbatterie), with M109 A5Ö 155mm self-propelled howitzers
 Jäger Company Korneuburg (Militia) (Jägerkompanie Korneuburg), in Mistelbach
 Engineer Battalion 3 (Pionierbataillon 3), in Melk
 Staff Company (Stabskompanie)
 Technical Engineer Company (Technische Pionierkompanie)
 Amphibious Engineer Company (Pionierkompanie wasserbeweglich), with Pionierbrücke 2000 foldable bridges and Watercat M9 boats
 Construction Engineer Company (Pionierbaukompanie), with Faltstraßengerät folding-road laying system and heavy construction equipment 
 Combat Support Engineer Company (Pionierkampfunterstützungskompanie), in Mautern an der Donau, with Pionierpanzer A1 armoured engineering vehicles and Greif armoured recovery vehicles

4th Panzergrenadier Brigade 
  4th Panzergrenadier Brigade (4. Panzergrenadierbrigade), in Hörsching
 Panzer Staff Battalion 4 (Panzerstabsbataillon 4), in Hörsching
 Staff Company (Stabskompanie)
 Command Support Company (Führungsunterstützungskompanie), (Note: the brigade's signal company)
 Supply and Transport Company (Nachschub- und Transportkompanie)
 Maintenance Company (Werkstattkompanie)
 NBC-defense Company (ABC-Abwehrkompanie)
 Instruction Company (Lehrkompanie)
 Panzer Battalion 14 (Panzerbataillon 14), in Wels
 Staff Company (Stabskompanie)
 1st Panzer Company (1. Panzerkompanie), with Leopard 2A4 main battle tanks
 2nd Panzer Company (2. Panzerkompanie), with Leopard 2A4 main battle tanks
 3rd Panzer Company (3. Panzerkompanie), with Leopard 2A4 main battle tanks
 4th Panzer (Reserve) Company (4. Panzerkompanie (Reserve)), with Leopard 2A4 main battle tanks
 Panzergrenadier Battalion 13 (Panzergrenadierbataillon 13), in Ried im Innkreis
 Staff Company (Stabskompanie)
 1st Panzergrenadier Company (1. Panzergrenadierkompanie), with Ulan Jäger fighting vehicles
 2nd Panzergrenadier Company (2. Panzergrenadierkompanie), with Ulan Jäger fighting vehicles, (Note: doubles as Cadre-Presence Unit)
 3rd Panzergrenadier Company (3. Panzergrenadierkompanie), with Ulan Jäger fighting vehicles
 Jäger Company Linzland (Militia) (Jägerkompanie Linzland), in Hörsching
 Panzergrenadier Battalion 35 (Panzergrenadierbataillon 35), in Großmittel
 Staff Company (Stabskompanie)
 1st Panzergrenadier Company (1. Panzergrenadierkompanie), with Ulan Jäger fighting vehicles
 2nd Panzergrenadier Company (2. Panzergrenadierkompanie), with Ulan Jäger fighting vehicles, (Note: doubles as Cadre-Presence Unit)
 3rd Panzergrenadier Company (3. Panzergrenadierkompanie), with Ulan Jäger fighting vehicles
 Jäger Company Wien 21/Floridsdorf (Militia) (Jägerkompanie Wien 21/Floridsdorf), in Felixdorf
 Reconnaissance and Artillery Battalion 4 (Aufklärungs- und Artilleriebataillon 4), in Allentsteig
 Staff Company (Stabskompanie)
 1st Reconnaissance Company (1. Aufklärungskompanie), with Husar reconnaissance vehicles
 2nd Reconnaissance Company (2. Aufklärungskompanie), with Husar reconnaissance vehicles
 1st Armoured Howitzer Battery (1. Panzerhaubitzbatterie), with M109 A5Ö 155mm self-propelled howitzers
 2nd Armoured Howitzer Battery (2. Panzerhaubitzbatterie), with M109 A5Ö 155mm self-propelled howitzers

6th Mountain Brigade 
  6th Mountain Brigade (6. Gebirgsbrigade), in Absam
 Staff Battalion 6 (Stabsbataillon 6), in Innsbruck
 Staff Company (Stabskompanie)
 Command Support Company (Führungsunterstützungskompanie), (Note: the brigade's signal company)
 Supply and Transport Company (Nachschub- und Transportkompanie)
 Maintenance Company (Werkstattkompanie)
 NBC-defense Company (ABC-Abwehrkompanie), in Absam
 Instruction Company (Lehrkompanie), in Absam
 Pack Animal Center (Tragtierzentrum), in Hochfilzen, with Haflinger horses
 Jäger Battalion 23 (Jägerbataillon 23), in Bludesch
 Staff Company (Stabskompanie)
 1st Mountain Jäger Company (1. Jägerkompanie hochgebirgsbeweglich), (Note: doubles as Cadre-Presence Unit)
 2nd Mountain Jäger Company (2. Jägerkompanie hochgebirgsbeweglich), in Landeck
 Jäger Company Oberland (Militia) (Jägerkompanie Oberland), in Absam
 Combat Support Company (Kampfunterstützungskompanie), with sGrW 86 120mm mortars and RBS 56 BILL anti-tank missiles
 Jäger Battalion 24 (Jägerbataillon 24), in Lienz
 Staff Company (Stabskompanie)
 1st Mountain Jäger Company (1. Jägerkompanie hochgebirgsbeweglich), (Note: doubles as Cadre-Presence Unit)
 2nd Mountain Jäger Company (2. Jägerkompanie hochgebirgsbeweglich), in St. Johann in Tirol
 Jäger Company (Militia) (Jägerkompanie)
 Combat Support Company (Kampfunterstützungskompanie), with sGrW 86 120mm mortars and RBS 56 BILL anti-tank missiles
 Jäger Battalion 26 (Jägerbataillon 26), in Spittal an der Drau
 Staff Company (Stabskompanie)
 1st Mountain Jäger Company (1. Jägerkompanie hochgebirgsbeweglich), (Note: doubles as Cadre-Presence Unit)
 2nd Mountain Jäger Company (2. Jägerkompanie hochgebirgsbeweglich)
 Jäger Company (Militia) (Jägerkompanie)
 Combat Support Company (Kampfunterstützungskompanie), with sGrW 86 120mm mortars and RBS 56 BILL anti-tank missiles
 Engineer Battalion 2 (Pionierbataillon 2), in Wals-Siezenheim
 Staff Company (Stabskompanie)
 Technical Engineer Company (Technische Pionierkompanie)
 Construction Engineer Company (Pionierbaukompanie), with heavy construction equipment
 Combat Support Engineer Company (Pionierkampfunterstützungskompanie), with Pionierpanzer A1 armoured engineering vehicles
 Mountain Engineer Company (Pionierkompanie (gebirgsbeweglich)), in Schwaz, with Pionierbrücke 2000 foldable bridges and goods cable lifts
 Field Encampment Systems Command (Kommando Feldlagersysteme)
 Mountain Warfare Center (Gebirgskampfzentrum), in Saalfelden

7th Jäger Brigade 
  7th Jäger Brigade (7. Jägerbrigade), in Klagenfurt
 Staff Battalion 7 (Stabsbataillon 7), in Klagenfurt
 Staff Company (Stabskompanie)
 Command Support Company (Führungsunterstützungskompanie), (Note: the brigade's signal company)
 Supply and Transport Company (Nachschub- und Transportkompanie)
 Maintenance Company (Werkstattkompanie)
 NBC-defense Company (ABC-Abwehrkompanie), in Graz
 Instruction Company (Lehrkompanie), in Bleiburg
 Jäger Battalion 12 (Jägerbataillon 12), in Amstetten
 Staff Company (Stabskompanie)
 1st Jäger Company (1. Jägerkompanie), (Note: doubles as Cadre-Presence Unit)
 2nd Jäger Company (2. Jägerkompanie)
 Jäger Company Sankt Pölten (Militia) (Jägerkompanie Sankt Pölten), in Amstetten
 Combat Support Company (Kampfunterstützungskompanie), with sGrW 86 120mm mortars and RBS 56 BILL anti-tank missiles
 Jäger Battalion 18 (Jägerbataillon 18), in Sankt Michael
 Staff Company (Stabskompanie)
 1st Jäger Company (1. Jägerkompanie)
 2nd Jäger Company (2. Jägerkompanie), (Note: doubles as Cadre-Presence Unit)
 Jäger Company Wolfsberg (Militia) (Jägerkompanie Wolfsberg), in Bleiburg
 Combat Support Company (Kampfunterstützungskompanie), with sGrW 86 120mm mortars and RBS 56 BILL anti-tank missiles
 Jäger Battalion 25 (Jägerbataillon 25), in Klagenfurt, (Note: airborne and helicopter assault battalion, and doubles as Cadre-Presence Unit)
 Staff Company (Stabskompanie)
 1st Jäger Company (1. Jägerkompanie)
 2nd Jäger Company (2. Jägerkompanie)
 Jäger Company Villach (Militia) (Jägerkompanie Villach), in Klagenfurt
 Combat Support Company (Kampfunterstützungskompanie), with sGrW 86 120mm mortars and RBS 56 BILL anti-tank missiles
 Reconnaissance and Artillery Battalion 7 (Aufklärungs- und Artilleriebataillon 4), in Feldbach
 Staff Company (Stabskompanie)
 1st Reconnaissance Company (1. Aufklärungskompanie), with Husar reconnaissance vehicles
 2nd Reconnaissance Company (2. Aufklärungskompanie), with Husar reconnaissance vehicles (Note: doubles as Cadre-Presence Unit)
 1st Armoured Howitzer Battery (1. Panzerhaubitzbatterie), with M109 A5Ö 155mm self-propelled howitzers
 2nd Armoured Howitzer Battery (2. Panzerhaubitzbatterie), with M109 A5Ö 155mm self-propelled howitzers
 Engineer Battalion 1 (Pionierbataillon 1), in Villach
 Staff Company (Stabskompanie)
 Technical Engineer Company (Technische Pionierkompanie)
 Construction Engineer Company (Pionierbaukompanie), with Faltstraßengerät folding-road laying system and heavy construction equipment (Note: doubles as Cadre-Presence Unit)
 Combat Support Engineer Company (Pionierkampfunterstützungskompanie), with Pionierpanzer A1 armoured engineering vehicles, (Note: doubles as Cadre-Presence Unit)
 Engineer Company (Pionierkompanie), with Pionierbrücke 2000 foldable bridges

Air Space Surveillance 
 Air Space Surveillance (Luftraumüberwachung), in Wals-Siezenheim
 Command and Operations Staff (Kommando und Betriebsstab), in Wals-Siezenheim
 Operations Staff (Betriebsstab), in Vienna
 Command and Control Center (Einsatzzentrale Basisraum), in St Johann im Pongau
 Surveillance Wing (Überwachungsgeschwader), at Zeltweg Air Base
 Staff Company (Stabskompanie)
 Military Flight Management (Militärflugleitung)
 1st Fighter Squadron, with Eurofighter Typhoon fighters
 2nd Fighter Squadron, with Eurofighter Typhoon fighters
 Fighter Trainer Squadron, with Saab 105Ö trainers
 Air Operations Company (Flugbetriebskompanie)
 Guard-Security and Training Company (Wachsicherungs- und Ausbildungskompanie)
 Training and Simulation Center (Ausbildungs- und Simulationszentrum)
 Radar Battalion (Radarbataillon), in Wals-Siezenheim
 Kolomansberg Radar Station
 Großer Speikkogel Radar Station
 Steinmandl Radar Station
 Air-defense Battalion 2 (Fliegerabwehrbataillon 2), at Zeltweg Air Base and in Aigen im Ennstal, with Mistral surface-to-air missiles and GDF-005 35mm anti-aircraft guns
 2nd Aircraft Yard (Fliegerwerft 2), at Zeltweg Air Base
 Eurofighter Typhoon maintenance, at Zeltweg Air Base
 Saab 105Ö maintenance, at Zeltweg Air Base
 PC-7 Turbo Trainer maintenance, at Zeltweg Air Base
 Technical-logistical Center (Technisch-Logistisches Zentrum), in Wals-Siezenheim

Air Support 
 Air Support (Luftunterstützung), at Hörsching Air Base
 Air Support Wing (Luftunterstützungsgeschwader), at Langenlebarn Air Base
 Medium Transport Helicopter Squadron (Mittlere Transporthubschrauberstaffel), with S-70A-42 Black Hawk helicopters
 Multirole Helicopter Squadron (Mehrzweckhubschrauberstaffel), with OH-58B Kiowa helicopters
 Light Air Transport Squadron (Leichte Lufttransport-Staffel), with PC-6 Turbo Porter planes
 Air Reconnaissance Squadron (Luftaufklärungsstaffel), with EADS Tracker unmanned aerial vehicles
 Liaison Helicopter Squadron (Verbindungshubschrauberstaffel), in Aigen im Ennstal, with Alouette III helicopters
 1st Light Transport Helicopter Squadron (Leichte Transporthubschrauberstaffel 1), at Hörsching Air Base, with AB 212 helicopters
 2nd Light Transport Helicopter Squadron (Leichte Transporthubschrauberstaffel 2), at Hörsching Air Base, with AB 212 helicopters
 Air Transport Squadron (Lufttransportstaffel), at Hörsching Air Base, with C-130K Hercules planes
 Air Operations Company (Flugbetriebskompanie), at Hörsching Air Base
 Helicopter Base (Hubschrauber-Stützpunkt), in Schwaz (without assigned units)
 1st Aircraft Yard (Fliegerwerft 1), at Langenlebarn Air Base
 S-70A-42 Black Hawk maintenance, at Langenlebarn Air Base
 OH-58B Kiowa maintenance, at Langenlebarn Air Base
 PC-6 Turbo Porter maintenance, at Langenlebarn Air Base
 3rd Aircraft Yard (Fliegerwerft 3), at Hörsching Air Base
 AB 212 maintenance, at Hörsching Air Base
 Alouette III maintenance, in Aigen im Ennstal
 Aviation Technology Logistics Center (Luftfahrttechnologisches Logistikzentrum), at Hörsching Air Base

Military Command Vienna 
 Military Command Vienna, in Vienna
 Guard Battalion (Gardebataillon), in Vienna
 Staff Company (Stabskompanie)
 1st Guard Company (1. Gardekompanie)
 2nd Guard Company (2. Gardekompanie)
 3rd Guard Company (3. Gardekompanie)
 4th Guard Company (4. Gardekompanie)
 5th Guard Company (5. Gardekompanie)
 Jäger Company Wien 13/Hietzing (Militia) (Jägerkompanie Wien 13/Hietzing), in Vienna
 Guard Music (Gardemusik)
 1st Jäger Battalion Wien "Hoch- und Deutschmeister" (Jägerbataillon Wien 1 "Hoch- und Deutschmeister"), in Vienna
 Staff Company (Stabskompanie)
 1st Jäger Company (1. Jägerkompanie)
 2nd Jäger Company (2. Jägerkompanie)
 3rd Jäger Company (3. Jägerkompanie)
 2nd Jäger Battalion Wien "Maria Theresia" (Jägerbataillon Wien 2 "Maria Theresia"), in Vienna
 Staff Company (Stabskompanie)
 1st Jäger Company (1. Jägerkompanie)
 2nd Jäger Company (2. Jägerkompanie)
 3rd Jäger Company (3. Jägerkompanie)
 Engineer Company Wien (Pionierkompanie Wien), in Vienna

Military Command Lower Austria 
 Military Command Lower Austria, in Sankt Pölten
 Jäger Battalion Niederösterreich "Kopal" (Jägerbataillon Niederösterreich "Kopal"), in Amstetten
 Staff Company (Stabskompanie)
 1st Jäger Company (1. Jägerkompanie)
 2nd Jäger Company (2. Jägerkompanie)
 3rd Jäger Company (3. Jägerkompanie)
 Engineer Company Niederösterreich (Pionierkompanie Niederösterreich), in Sankt Pölten

Military Command Upper Austria 
 Military Command Upper Austria, in Hörsching
 Jäger Battalion Oberösterreich (Jägerbataillon Oberösterreich), in Hörsching
 Staff Company (Stabskompanie)
 1st Jäger Company (1. Jägerkompanie)
 2nd Jäger Company (2. Jägerkompanie)
 3rd Jäger Company (3. Jägerkompanie)
 Engineer Company Oberösterreich (Pionierkompanie Oberösterreich), in Hörsching

Military Command Burgenland 
 Military Command Burgenland, in Eisenstadt
 Jäger Battalion Burgenland (Jägerbataillon Burgenland), in Güssing
 Staff Company (Stabskompanie)
 1st Jäger Company (1. Jägerkompanie)
 2nd Jäger Company (2. Jägerkompanie)
 3rd Jäger Company (3. Jägerkompanie)
 Engineer Company Burgenland (Pionierkompanie Burgenland), in Eisenstadt

Military Command Styria 
 Military Command Styria, in Graz
 Jäger Battalion Steiermark "Erzherzog Johann" (Jägerbataillon Steiermark "Erzherzog Johann"), in Sankt Michael
 Staff Company (Stabskompanie)
 1st Jäger Company (1. Jägerkompanie)
 2nd Jäger Company (2. Jägerkompanie)
 3rd Jäger Company (3. Jägerkompanie)
 Engineer Company Steiermark (Pionierkompanie Steiermark), in Graz

Military Command Salzburg 
 Military Command Salzburg, in Wals-Siezenheim
 Jäger Battalion Salzburg "Erzherzog Rainer" (Jägerbataillon Salzburg "Erzherzog Rainer"), in Tamsweg
 Staff Company (Stabskompanie)
 1st Jäger Company (1. Jägerkompanie)
 2nd Jäger Company (2. Jägerkompanie)
 3rd Jäger Company (3. Jägerkompanie)
 Engineer Company Salzburg (Pionierkompanie Salzburg), in Wals-Siezenheim

Military Command Carinthia 
 Military Command Carinthia, in Klagenfurt
 Jäger Battalion Kärnten (Jägerbataillon Kärnten), in Klagenfurt
 Staff Company (Stabskompanie)
 1st Jäger Company (1. Jägerkompanie)
 2nd Jäger Company (2. Jägerkompanie)
 3rd Jäger Company (3. Jägerkompanie)
 Engineer Company Kärnten (Pionierkompanie Kärnten), in Klagenfurt

Military Command Tyrol 
 Military Command Tyrol, in Innsbruck
 Jäger Battalion Tirol (Jägerbataillon Tirol), in Absam
 Staff Company (Stabskompanie)
 1st Jäger Company (1. Jägerkompanie)
 2nd Jäger Company (2. Jägerkompanie)
 3rd Jäger Company (3. Jägerkompanie)
 Engineer Company Tirol (Pionierkompanie Tirol), in Landeck

Military Command Vorarlberg 
 Military Command Vorarlberg, in Bregenz
 Jäger Battalion Vorarlberg (Jägerbataillon Vorarlberg), in Bregenz
 Staff Company (Stabskompanie)
 1st Jäger Company (1. Jägerkompanie)
 2nd Jäger Company (2. Jägerkompanie)
 3rd Jäger Company (3. Jägerkompanie)
 Engineer Company Vorarlberg (Pionierkompanie Vorarlberg), in Bludesch

Armed Forces Basis Command 
 Armed Forces Basis Command (Kommando Streitkräftebasis), in Vienna
 Command Support School (Führungsunterstützungs-schule), in Vienna
 Armed Forces Logistic School (Heereslogistikschule), in Vienna
 Supply Regiment 1 (Versorgungsregiment 1), in Gratkorn
 Staff Company (Stabskompanie)
 4x Supply and Transport Companies (Nachschub-Transportkompanie)
 Maintenance Company (Werkstattkompanie)
 Supply Battalion (Versorgungsbataillon) (Reserve unit), in Gratkorn
 Staff Company (Stabskompanie)
 3x Supply and Transport Companies (Nachschub-Transportkompanie)
 Guard and Security Company (Wach- und Sicherungskompanie)
 Armed Forces Logistic Center (Heereslogistikzentrum), in Vienna
 Armed Forces Logistic Center (Heereslogistikzentrum), in Wels
 Armed Forces Logistic Center (Heereslogistikzentrum), in Wals-Siezenheim
 Armed Forces Logistic Center (Heereslogistikzentrum), in St. Johann in Tirol
 Armed Forces Logistic Center (Heereslogistikzentrum), in Graz
 Armed Forces Logistic Center (Heereslogistikzentrum), in Klagenfurt
 Armed Forces Ammunition Establishment (Heeresmunitionsanstalt), in Großmittel
 Armed Forces Ammunition Establishment (Heeresmunitionsanstalt), in Stadl-Paura
 Armed Forces Ammunition Establishment (Heeresmunitionsanstalt), in Buchberg
 Armed Forces Clothing Establishment (Heeresbekleidungsanstalt), in Brunn am Gebirge
 Military Working Dogs Center (Militärhundezentrum), in Bruckneudorf
 Informations-Communications-Technology and Cyber-security Center (Informations-Kommunikations-Technologie und Cybersicherheitszentrum), in Vienna
 Medical Center East (Sanitätszentrum Ost), in Vienna-Stammersdorf
 Armed Forces Hospital (Heeresspital), in Vienna
 Armed Forces Pharmacy (Heeresapotheke), in Vienna
 Medical School (Sanitätsschule), in Vienna
 Health and Nursing school (Gesundheits- und Krankenpflegeschule), in Vienna
 Occupational Healthcare Center (Arbeitsmedizinisches Zentrum), in Vienna
 Medical Establishment (Sanitätsanstalt), in Baden
 Medical Establishment (Sanitätsanstalt), in St Pölten
 Emergency Medical Service (Notärztlicher Dienst), in Vienna
 Military Medical Service (Truppenärztlicher Dienst), in Vienna
 Medical Center South (Sanitätszentrum Süd), in Graz
 Field Ambulatory (Feldambulanz), in Graz
 Training Company (Lehrkompanie), in Klagenfurt
 Medical Center West (Sanitätszentrum West), in Innsbruck
 Field Ambulatory (Feldambulanz), in Innsbruck
 Training Company (Lehrkompanie), in Salzburg
 Field Ambulatory (Feldambulanz), in Hörsching
 Demining Service (Entminungsdienst), in Vienna
 Armed Forces Sport Centers in Vienna, Maria Enzersdorf, Linz, Graz, Innsbruck, Finkenstein am Faaker See, Salzburg, Dornbirn, Hochfilzen and Seebenstein

Jäger Battalion Structure 
The Jäger battalions of the Austrian Army are organized as follows:

 Jäger Battalion (Jägerbataillon)
 Staff Company (Stabskompanie)
 Signal Platoon (Fernmeldezug)
 Supply Platoon (Versorgungszug)
 Maintenance Platoon (Instandsetzungszug)
 Medical Platoon (Sanitätszug)
 1st Jäger Company (1. Jägerkompanie)
 3x Jäger platoons (3x Jägerzug)
 Combat Support Platoon (Kampfunterstützungszug), with mGrW 82 81mm mortars, üsMG M2 heavy machine guns, and Recoilless Rifles 66/79
 2nd Jäger Company (2. Jägerkompanie)
 3x Jäger platoons (3x Jägerzug)
 Combat Support Platoon (Kampfunterstützungszug), with mGrW 82 81mm mortars, üsMG M2 heavy machine guns, and Recoilless Rifles 66/79
 Jäger Company (Militia) (Jägerkompanie)
 3x Jäger platoons (3x Jägerzüge)
 Combat Support Platoon (Kampfunterstützungszug), with mGrW 82 81mm mortars, üsMG M2 heavy machine guns, and Recoilless Rifles 66/79
 Combat Support Company (Kampfunterstützungskompanie)
 Heavy Mortar Platoon (Schwerer Granatwerferzug), with GrW 86 120mm mortars
 Anti-tank Guided Missile Platoon (Panzerabwehrlenkwaffenzug), with RBS 56 BILL anti-tank missiles
 Reconnaissance Platoon (Aufklärungszug)
 Support Platoon (Unterstützungszug), with combat engineers

Armed Forces structure graphic

Geographic distribution of operational units

References

External links
 Website of the Austrian Armed Forces

Austrian Armed Forces